The Confederation of Trade Unions of the Republika Srpska (SSRS) is a trade union centre in Republika Srpska, in Bosnia and Herzegovina. It was founded in August 1992 and claims a membership of 190,000.

References

Trade unions in Bosnia and Herzegovina
1992 establishments in Bosnia and Herzegovina
Trade unions established in 1992
Economy of Republika Srpska
Organizations based in Republika Srpska
Economy of Banja Luka